Leylah Fernandez won the girls' singles tennis title at the 2019 French Open, defeating Emma Navarro in the final, 6–3, 6–2.

Cori Gauff was the defending champion, but chose to participate at women's singles qualifying as a Wild Card instead and lost to Kaja Juvan in the second round.

Seeds

Draw

Finals

Top half

Section 1

Section 2

Bottom half

Section 3

Section 4

Qualifying

Seeds

Qualifiers

Lucky loser

Draw

First qualifier

Second qualifier

Third qualifier

Fourth qualifier

Fifth qualifier

Sixth qualifier

Seventh qualifier

Eighth qualifier

External links 
Draw
 Qualifying draw

Girls' Singles
French Open, 2019 Girls' Singles